Perversion is a behavior that is a serious deviation from what is orthodox or normal.

Perversion may also refer to:
 Perversion (album), a 1998 industrial album by Gravity Kills
 Perversion (film), a 1979 Brazilian exploitation film
 Perversion for Profit, a 1965 anti-pornography film
 Perversions of Science, a 1997 science fiction/horror television series
 Perverse (album), a 1993 album by the British rock band Jesus Jones
 Pervert!, a 2005 film
 "Perversion", a song by Rob Zombie from Hellbilly Deluxe
 "Pervert", a song by the Descendents from I Don't Want to Grow Up
 Tendril perversion, a reversal of handedness in helical curves